Songnisan National Park (sometimes spelled "Sokrisan") is located in the center of the Sobaek Mountains range, on the border between the provinces of Chungcheongbuk-do and Gyeongsangbuk-do, South Korea. The area comprises the valleys of Hwayang, Seonyu, and Ssanggok and the  mountain Songnisan, which has given the park its name. It was designated as the country's sixth national park in 1970. The park's most popular attraction is one of Korea's largest temples, the Buddhist temple Beopjusa, initially constructed in 653.

Songnisan (the Korean letters spell out "Sokrisan" but the name is actually pronounced "Songnisan") became a national park in 1970. It is the sixth-largest of Korea’s mountain parks with an area of 275 km2. The name means “Remote from the Ordinary World”—a reference to its somewhat isolated position in the very center of South Korea. The mountains belong to the southern arm of the greater Sobaek Range, and the park lies on the border between North Chungcheong and North Gyeongsong Provinces.

In 1999, someone decided to cash in on the name of a famous set of mountains in Europe by dubbing the ridge that connects Gubyeongsan, Songnisan, Gwaneumbong and Sanhakbong the Chungbuk Alps. The name is a little misleading, as the highest mountain here is only a humble 1,058 meters. On the English brochure available at the tourist center in the Songni-dong Bus Terminal building, it states: “A hiking path was opened and transformed into a commercial product.” This perhaps says something about how Koreans view their mountains and is a hint that hiking here might not always be peaceful and relaxing. The park gets about 1.5 million visitors a year.

Songnisan is very scenic. On wet days clouds often catch in the valleys between the mountains, creating a dramatic layered effect. In the spring, the area is known for the brilliant pink azaleas that bloom on the mountainsides. The mountains have a craggy look, with many interesting granite outcroppings and cliffs.

Songnisan National Park was designated as the sixth national park in Korea in 1970 and was called “Second Geumgang” or “Sogeumgang (Small Geumgang)” because of its spectacular beauty.
This rocky mountain is located across many areas in Chungbuk and Gyeongbuk provinces and spans across a total area of 274.541 km2. The main peaks Cheonwangbong, Birobong, and Munjangdae are connected along the baekdudaegan mountain ranges (Backbone of Korea) with well developed stone peaks and ridges.
Songnisan is connected to other adjacent mountains, and based around Cheonwangbong (1,058 m) in the south, eight peaks are stretched out like a bow including Birobong, Munjangdae, and Gwaneumbong.

Songnisan has natural treasures such as the Jeongipumsong (a pine tree that, in Korean legend, was awarded the rank of minister by King Sejo), otter, flying squirrel, and mandarin duck. In addition, there are many bird species that are designated for the purpose of protection by the Ministry of Environment as well as endangered animals such as the small-eared cat and marten. Moreover, a variety of native fish species live in the streams flowing into Geumgang, Nakdonggang, and Hangang.

References

External links

The park's page on Korea National Park Service's website

National parks of South Korea
Protected areas established in 1970
Parks in North Chungcheong Province
Parks in North Gyeongsang Province
1970 establishments in South Korea